The 2015 South Norfolk District Council election was held on Thursday 7 May 2015 to elect the whole council as part of 2015 United Kingdom local elections coinciding with the general election. The council continued to consist of 46 councillors and as immediately after the previous election, the council was controlled by local Conservatives, with local Liberal Democrats being the only opposition.  The governing group's numbers were augmented by two councillors at the expense of that opposition group. Three defecting-from-majority independent councillors lost their council seats.

Composition of council seats before election
After the 2011 election, 38 councillors were Conservatives and 8 were Liberal Democrats. Since then, three Conservative councillors had left the party's grouping. Two of them (Keith Weeks, Bressingham and Burston ward, and Jon Herbert, Mulbarton ward) now formed the South Norfolk Independent Group, while the third (Terry Blowfield, Stratton ward) sat as an independent.

Candidates by party

South Norfolk had 36 wards, providing for 46 candidates. In this election, there were a total of 144 candidates standing (an increase of 23% from the 117 in the last election in 2011).

The two parties with incumbent councillors were the Conservatives and the Liberal Democrats. The Conservatives were standing in all wards, with a total of 44 candidates. The Liberal Democrats were standing 35 candidates in 32 wards.

Out of the other parties standing, Labour had 39 candidates in 32 wards, UKIP had 13 candidates in 13 wards, and the Green Party had 12 candidates in 12 wards. There was one independent candidate, Jackie Bircham, standing in Chedgrave and Thurton ward.

Election results

|-bgcolor=#F6F6F6
| colspan=2 style="text-align: right; margin-right: 1em" | Total
| style="text-align: right;" | 46
| colspan=5 |
| style="text-align: right;" | 92,692
| style="text-align: right;" | 
|-

Candidates by ward
South Norfolk council is made up of 46 councillors elected in 36 different wards. 27 wards elect one councillor, 8 wards elect two councillors, and one ward (Diss) elects three councillors.

29 incumbent councillors are re-standing in the wards they represented before this election (denoted by a *).

Abbey ward

Beck Vale ward

Bressingham and Burston ward

Brooke ward

Bunwell ward

Chedgrave and Thurton ward

Cringleford ward

Cromwells ward

Dickleburgh ward

Diss ward

Ditchingham and Broome ward

Earsham ward

Easton ward

Forncett ward

Gillingham ward

Harleston ward

Hempnall ward

Hethersett ward
Jacky Sutton stood as the Liberal Democrat candidate in Hethersett in 2011. Her vote-share here is compared with the performance of the Labour candidate in 2011.

Hingham and Deopham ward

Loddon ward

Mulbarton ward

New Costessey ward

Newton Flotman ward

Northfields ward

Old Costessey ward

Poringland with the Framinghams ward

Rockland ward

Roydon ward

Rustens ward

Scole ward

Stoke Holy Cross ward

Stratton ward
Linden Parker stood as a Liberal Democrat candidate in Stratton in 2011.

Tasburgh ward

Thurlton ward

Town ward

Wicklewood ward

References

External links
South Norfolk Conservatives - 2015 District Council Election Microsite
South Norfolk Greens - Local candidates
South Norfolk Labour - 2015
South Norfolk Liberal Democrats - Elections 2015
South Norfolk UKIP - Local candidates

2015 English local elections
May 2015 events in the United Kingdom
2015
2010s in Norfolk